is a former Japanese football player.

Playing career
Shimamura was born in Kumamoto Prefecture on June 3, 1971. After graduating from Ozu High School, he joined Toyota Motors (later Nagoya Grampus Eight) in 1990. He played many matches as midfielder in 1992 J.League Cup and Grampus qualified to semifinals. He also played many matches in 1993 season. However he could not play at all in the match from 1994 and retired end of 1995 season.

Club statistics

References

External links

1971 births
Living people
Association football people from Kumamoto Prefecture
Japanese footballers
Japan Soccer League players
J1 League players
Nagoya Grampus players
Association football midfielders